The 2002–03 Football League First Division (referred to as the Nationwide First Division for sponsorship reasons) was the eleventh season of the league under its current format as the second tier of English football.

Portsmouth won the division to return to the Premier League after a fifteen-year absence. In Harry Redknapp's first full season in charge the team secured the title on 27 April, with a victory over Rotherham, having been promoted with four games to spare by defeating Burnley.

Leicester City were promoted at the first attempt following their relegation. Their promotion was contentious as they entered administration during the season due to debts in excess of £50 million stemming from their loss of Premier League income and major investment in a new stadium, but were able to write-off these entirely when a new consortium took control and therefore avoided having to sell off players. Following this incident, the Football League would introduce rules that penalised any club entering administration with a ten-point points deduction; although Leicester would still have finished in second place had been this been applied.

Wolverhampton Wanderers won the play-offs to reach the modern-day Premiership for the first time after a 3–0 win in the play-off final against a Sheffield United team which had reached the semi-finals of both domestic cup competitions. This marked a return to top-flight football for Wolves after a nineteen-year exodus that had seen them fall as low as the fourth tier. Also leaving the division were Sheffield Wednesday, Brighton & Hove Albion and Grimsby Town, who were all relegated.

Team changes from previous season

From the First Division
Promoted to the Premiership:
Manchester City
West Bromwich Albion
Birmingham City

Relegated to the Second Division:
Crewe Alexandra
Barnsley
Stockport County

To the First Division
Relegated from the Premiership:
Leicester City
Ipswich Town
Derby County

Promoted from the Second Division:
Brighton & Hove Albion
Reading
Stoke City

Team overview

Stadia and locations

Note 1: Wimbledon rented the use of Crystal Palace's Selhurst Park home.

Personnel and sponsoring

Managerial changes

Note 2: Although Gregory was dismissed on this date, he had already been suspended from his post on 21 March after "serious allegations" were made against him.
Note 3: Burley was initially appointed on 31 March as interim manager following John Gregory's suspension.

League table

Play-offs

Awards

PFA Team of the Year

References 

 
2002-03

England
2